Jerry was a racehorse.  He won the 1840 Grand National, defeating twelve rivals. He was ridden by Bartholomew Bretherton, trained by George Dockeray and owned by Henry Villebois.

References

External links
 Detailed account of Jerry's Grand National win

1830 racehorse births
National Hunt racehorses
Non-Thoroughbred racehorses
Racehorses trained in the United Kingdom
Racehorses bred in the United Kingdom
Grand National winners